Henry Dudley Ryder, 4th Earl of Harrowby (3 May 1836 – 11 December 1900), was  a British peer, succeeding his brother as the Earl of Harrowby and the 4th Viscount Sandon, on 26 March 1900, and dying nine months later.

Harrowby was the son of Dudley Ryder, 2nd Earl of Harrowby, and his wife, Frances Stuart, fourth daughter of the first Marquess of Bute. He was educated at Harrow School and Christ Church, Oxford, and became a senior partner at Coutts & Co. He held the offices of Deputy Lieutenant (D.L.) and Justice of the Peace (J.P.).   1900.

Lord Harrowby married Susan Juliana Maria Hamilton Dent, only daughter of John Villiers Dent and his wife, Susan Orde, on 17 May 1859.

They became the parents of eight children. He died in December 1900, at sea, on his yacht Miranda, off Algiers, and was buried at Sandon. He was succeeded in his titles by his son, John.

References

External links

1836 births
1900 deaths
People educated at Harrow School
Alumni of Christ Church, Oxford
Earls of Harrowby
Henry